Plus-end-directed kinesin ATPase (kinesin) is an enzyme with systematic name kinesin ATP phosphohydrolase (plus-end-directed). This enzyme catalyses the following chemical reaction

 ATP + H2O  ADP + phosphate

This enzyme also hydrolyses GTP.

See also 
 Kinesin

References

External links 
 

EC 3.6.4